Idols was a television show on the Dutch television network RTL 4, which is part of the Idols series based on the popular British show Pop Idol.  The show is a contest to determine the best young singer in the Netherlands.

The show is divided in two sections, the first being the audition round, an open audition where everyone who wants to try is allowed to sing. The first couple of shows usually show the worst and the best contenders in these auditions. Once the best are selected, the theater round starts. Here the singers who survived the auditions have to prove they really have what it takes to become an idol. In a couple of shows these performers are narrowed down to just 10 finalists, with each contestant performing live.

In the first 2 seasons there were four judges, but starting with season 3 there are just three. The judges provide critiques of each competitor's performance and determine nine of the ten people who enter the final shows. In the final shows they just comment, but don't have any power anymore. After the first part of the show viewers have around one hour to vote by telephone and text messages to vote for their favorite contestant, later in the night the results of 'Idols' starts in which the results are presented and the contestant with the fewest votes is sent home.

On 5 November the Dutch broadcaster RTL announced a fifth season which will be broadcast on RTL 5 in 2016.

Season 1
Auditions began in 2002 and were held Zeist, Eindhoven, Hoofddorp, Rotterdam and Assen. 7,626 people auditioned in the debut season.

94 successful auditionees progressed to the next stage at the TheaterHotel De Oranjerie in Roermond, Limburg. In a chorus line of ten, contestants re-audition with a self-chosen song. 50 contestants made the second day of the theatre round where groups based on gender were formed to sing one pre-determined song: "Isn't She Lovely?"  and "I'm So Excited" , for the males and females respectively.

Semi Final Qualifyings
From this stage, all shows are broadcast live from Studio 22 in Hilversum.

Top 30
Format: 3 out of 10 making the finals each week + one Wildcard

Finals Elimination Chart

Season 2
Boris Titulaer won the contest, with Maud being the runner-up.

Semi Final Qualifyings
Top 27
Format: 3 (2 Viewers & 1 Judges Choice) out of 9 making the finals each week + 1 additional Wildcard

Finals Elimination Chart

Season 3
Season 3 started on October 22, 2005 with these notable changes: the two new presenters and the jury now consists of three members instead of the previous four. Raffaëla Paton won the contest, with Floortje being runner-up.

Semi Final Qualifyings
Top 27
Format: 4 (3 Viewers & 1 Judges Choice) out of 9 making the finals each week + 1 additional Wildcard

Finals Elimination Chart

Season 4

Season 5
Auditions began in January 2016 and were held Novotel Schiphol Airport in Hoofddorp. The first audition show attracted a record-breaking 1.5 million viewers.

93 contestants progressed to the next stage at Theater de Kom in Nieuwegein, Utrecht. In a chorus line of ten, contestants re-audition with a pre-selected song. The songs were "Stay with Me" by Sam Smith, "Chandelier" by Sia, "Stitches" by Shawn Mendes, and "Hello" by Adele. 35 contestants advanced to the second theatre round where groups of three or four had to perform a pre-determined song, either "Marvin Gaye" by Charlie Puth ft. Meghan Trainor, "Never Forget You" by MNEK & Zara Larsson or "Sexy als ik dans" by Nielson. Twenty contestants progressed to the next stage.

The next round took place on Bali. First, the contestants had to perform a duet. Half of the contestants were eliminated. The remaining ten entered an acoustic piano round in which they performed a song of their choice. Two more contestants were sent home, narrowing the number of contestants down to eight that will enter the live shows.

During each live show, two contestants were sent home until two finalists remained. These two finalists faced off in a final during which viewers at home could cast their vote.

Judges
Edwin Jansen (2003-2004)
Henkjan Smits (2003-2006)
Eric van Tijn (2003-2008)
Jerney Kaagman (2003-2008)
John Ewbank (2008)
Gordon Heuckeroth (2008)
Martijn Krabbé (2016-2017)
Ronald Molendijk (2016-2017)
Jamai Loman (2016-2017)
Eva Simons (2016-2017)

Hosts 
Tooske Ragas (2003-2004) 
Reinout Oerlemans (2003-2004) 
Chantal Janzen (2006) 
Martijn Krabbé (2006-2008)
Wendy van Dijk (2008)
Ruben Nicolai (2016-2017)
Lieke van Lexmond (2016-2017)

References

External links
Season 3 official website 
Season 4 official website 

 
Television series by Fremantle (company)
2002 Dutch television series debuts
2008 Dutch television series endings
Dutch-language television shows
Dutch television series based on British television series
RTL 4 original programming